Krzysztof Sokalski (born August 13, 1986) is a retired Polish footballer (striker). He was a member of the Poland U-21 team.

External links
 

1986 births
Living people
Polish footballers
ŁKS Łódź players
Widzew Łódź players
Footballers from Łódź
Association football forwards